Trust in the Lifeforce of the Deep Mystery is the second studio album by English band The Comet Is Coming. It was released on 15 March 2019 under Impulse! Records.

Track listing

Charts

References

2019 albums
The Comet Is Coming albums
Impulse! Records albums